David Hardin Sharpe (February 2, 1910 – March 30, 1980) was an American actor and stunt performer, sometimes billed as Davy Sharpe.

Biography
 
Sharpe won the US National Tumbling Championship in 1925 and 1926. He began his film career as a child actor in the 1920s. He was married for a short time to film actress Gertrude Messinger.  Eventually he became the "Ramrod" (stunt coordinator) for Republic Pictures from 1939 until mid-1942 when the USA entered World War II. He was replaced in this role by Tom Steele while Sharpe joined the Army Air Corps in 1943.

Death
Sharpe died in 1980, aged 70, of Lou Gehrig's disease (some sources cited Parkinson's disease).

Recognition
In 1979, Sharpe received the Yakima Canutt Award, which honors stuntmen. Sharpe was inducted into the Stuntman's Hall of Fame in 1980.

Selected filmography

 Air Tight (1931) 
 Call a Cop! (1931)
 Too Many Women (1932)
 Social Error (1935)
 Ghost Town (1936)
 Idaho Kid (1936)
 Desert Justice (1936)
 Santa Fe Rides (1937)
 Melody of the Plains (1937)
 Galloping Dynamite (1937)
 Where Trails Divide (1937)
 Young Dynamite (1937)
 Daredevils of the Red Circle (1939)
 Dick Tracy Returns (1938)
 Man's Country (1938)
 Covered Wagon Trails (1940)
 Mutiny in the Arctic (1941)
 Silver Stallion (1941)
 Texas to Bataan (1942)
 Trail Riders (1942)
 Two Fisted Justice (1943)
 Haunted Ranch (1943)
 The Good Humor Man (1950)

References

External links

 
 Dave Sharpe at B-Westerns
 

1910 births
1980 deaths
Male actors from St. Louis
American stunt performers
American male film actors
Male film serial actors
Male Western (genre) film actors
American male child actors
Neurological disease deaths in California
Deaths from motor neuron disease
United States Army Air Forces soldiers
United States Army Air Forces personnel of World War II
20th-century American male actors